The Rewa Bridge is a four-lane concrete girder road bridge over the Rewa River joining Suva and Nausori in Fiji. It is the longest bridge in Fiji and the longest bridge of its type in the South Pacific.

The bridge was funded by a partnership between the European Union and the government of Fiji and was constructed by Fletcher Construction for the government of Fiji between October 2003 and August 2006 for a cost of FJ$29.7 million.

Old Rewa Bridge

The new Rewa bridge replaces a 60-year-old structurally unsound steel bridge. As of 2011, the old Rewa bridge is still in existence. There has been a proposal put forward by the Nausori Town Council to use the old bridge as flea market. However, in 2011, the Fijian Ministry of Works allocated FJ$1million in order to dismantle the bridge in order so that the materials can be used for other bridges in the country.

References

Bridges completed in 2006
Bridges in Fiji
Road bridges